The megaron temple of Domu de Orgia is an important nuragic archaeological site located in the territory of Esterzili, in the Province of South Sardinia.

Description
The temple, located at more than 1000 meters of altitude, is of the megaron type and is the most important of this typology among those present on the island. Enclosed in an elliptical sacred fence, the building is built with blocks of schist. The temple has a rectangular plan of about 10 meters for 20 and consists of two rooms preceded by an in antis vestibule.

The excavations, which have brought to light various bronze statutettes, have allowed to date the complex to the second half of the II millennium BC. With frequentations until the Roman times.

External links
Sardegna Cultura : Esterzili, Tempio di Domu de Orgia

Archaeological sites in Sardinia